Le Fousseret is a commune and a large village in the Haute-Garonne department in southwestern France.

Geography
The village lies in the middle of the commune, on the left bank of the Louge, which flows northeast through the middle of the commune. The border between La Fousseret and Mondavezan is formed by the river Louge.

The commune is bordered by nine other communes: Pouy-de-Touges to the north, Castelnau-Picampeau to the northwest, Gratens and Marignac-Lasclares to the northeast, Saint-Élix-le-Château to the east, Lavelanet-de-Comminges to the southeast, Cazères to the south, Mondavezan across the river Louge to the southwest, and finally by Montoussin to the west.

Population

The inhabitants of the commune are known as Fousseretois

International relations
Le Fousseret is twinned with:
  La Pobla de Segur, Spain

See also
Communes of the Haute-Garonne department

References

Communes of Haute-Garonne